This is a list of online digital musical document libraries. Each source listed below offers access to collections of digitized music documents (typically originating from printed or manuscript musical sources).  Some contain scanned images, some contains fully encoded scores, some contain encodings adapted for music playback (e.g. via MIDI), and others (e.g KernScores) are adapted for music analysis.  In toto, several thousand scores are represented here.

See also
Virtual Library of Musicology
List of online music databases

References

Projects
Digital library projects
Digital Musical Document Libraries
Digital library projects
 
Music libraries